Nerita versicolor is a species of sea snail, a marine gastropod mollusk in the family Neritidae.

Description
The maximum recorded shell length is 20.5 mm.

Shell small, consisting of 3 whorls and a smooth protoconch. The body whorl is large and flattened globose briefly, concave below the suture, sculptured with spiral cords 15–17 . The aperture is wide . The columela is lunate, with a straight edge and contains four teeth. The color of the shell is irregular with white, black and red or pink. The operculum is calcareous, slightly concave papillose and gray to brown externally

Distribution
Widespread species in the Caribbean Sea. In Venezuela is noted for its coast, just as in Colombia

References

External links
 Integrated Taxonomic Information System. Nerita versicolor  Gmelin, 1791 Taxonomic Serial No.: 70167 
 World Register of Marine Species Nerita versicolor Gmelin, 1791 AphiaID: 419506

Neritidae
Gastropods described in 1791